Jana Pallaske (born 20 May 1979) is a German actress and singer for the rock band Spitting Off Tall Buildings.

Partial filmography

 Alaska.de (2000), as Sabine
 Jeans (2001), as Nina
 Engel & Joe (2001), as Joe
 Baader (2002), as Karin
 Extreme Ops (2002), as Kittie
 Tatort (2002-2018, TV Series), as Susanne Baumann / Daniela Mertens / Svenja
 Alarm für Cobra 11 – Die Autobahnpolizei (2003-2010, TV Series), as Hanna / Alicia Schulze / Annika Meier
 Love in Thoughts (2004), as Elli
 EuroTrip (2004), as Anna, The Camera Store Girl
 SK Kölsch (2004, TV Series), as Sandy
 Ein Fall für zwei (2005, TV Series)
 Stürmisch verliebt (2005, TV Movie), as Patrizia "Pat" Kolditz
  (2005), as Jale
  (2006), as Hannah
 Die Cleveren (2006, TV Series), as Vicky
 Berndivent (2006, TV Series), as Sarah Bernard
 Die ProSieben Märchenstunde (2006, TV Series), as Maria
  (2006, TV Mini-Series), as Butsche's Sister
 Vollidiot (2007), as Petra
 Alles Lüge – Auf der Suche nach Rio Reiser (2007, TV Movie), as Julia
  (2008), as Margarethe
  (2008), as Katja
 Speed Racer (2008), as Delilah
 Palermo Shooting (2008), as Student
 Maja (2008, TV Series), as Paula Hilsch
  (2008), as Mandy
 Screamers: The Hunting (2009), as Schwartz
 Kopf oder Zahl (2009), as Irina
  (2009), as Nika
 Inglourious Basterds (2009), as Babette
 12 Paces Without a Head (2009), as Okka
 Men in the City (2009), as Nina Hellmich
 Flemming (2009, TV Series), as Fenja Landers
 Snowblind (2010, TV Series), as Barbara Midnite
 SOKO Wismar (2010, TV Series), as Silke Jaspers
 Lasko – Die Faust Gottes (2010, TV Series), as Sina
 IK1 – Touristen in Gefahr (2011), as Lisa Blum
  (2011), as Nina Hellmich
 Geography of the Hapless Heart (2012), as Anna (segment "Berlin") – unfinished anthology film
 Fack ju Göhte (2013), as Charlie
 Crossing Lines (2013), as Kidnapper
 Cat.8 (2013, TV Series), as Jane
 Fack ju Göhte 2 (2015), as Charlie
 Burg Schreckenstein (2016), as Melanie
 Die Vampirschwestern 3 (2016), as Anastasia
 Vier gegen die Bank (2016), as Heidi
 Fack ju Göhte 3 (2016), as Charlie
 Lassie - Eine abenteuerliche Reise (2020), as Franka

External links

Official MySpace page
Current musical project "A girl called Johnny"

Official web page

1979 births
German film actresses
Living people
Musicians from Berlin
Actresses from Berlin
German rock singers
German television actresses
21st-century German actresses
21st-century German women singers